The Roman Catholic Diocese of Chalan Kanoa is an ecclesiastical territory or diocese of the Catholic Church in the United States. It comprises the territory of the Commonwealth of the Northern Mariana Islands and is a suffragan of the Metropolitan Archdiocese of Agaña. The diocese was canonically erected on 8 November 1984 by Pope John Paul II. Its territories were taken from the archdiocese based in Guam.

The Diocese of Chalan Kanoa is led by a prelate bishop who pastors the mother church, the Our Lady of Mount Carmel Cathedral on Saipan.

List of churches 
 Our Lady of Mount Carmel Cathedral (Chalan Kanoa, Saipan)
 Kristo Rai Parish (Garapan, Saipan)
 Saint Jude Thaddeus Parish (Koblerville, Saipan)
 San Roque Parish (San Roque, Saipan)
 Santa Soledad Parish (Kagman, Saipan)
 Nuestra Senora Bithen Delos Remedios Parish (Tanapag, Saipan)
 Korean Catholic Mission Church (Chalan Kanoa, Saipan)
 San Antonio Parish (San Antonio, Saipan)
 San Jose Parish (San Jose, Saipan)
 San Vicente Ferrer Parish (San Vicente, Saipan)
 San Francisco De Borja Catholic Church (Teneto, Rota)
 San Isidro Parish (Sinapolo, Rota)
 San Jose Parish (Tinian)

Ordinaries
Tomas Aguon Camacho (1984–2010)
Ryan Pagente Jimenez (Apostolic Administrator: 2010-2016) (Bishop: 2016–present)

See also

 Catholic Church by country
 Catholic Church in the United States
 Ecclesiastical Province of Agaña
 Global organisation of the Catholic Church
 Kristo Rai Church
 Mount Carmel School
 List of Roman Catholic archdioceses (by country and continent)
 List of Roman Catholic dioceses (alphabetical) (including archdioceses)
 List of Roman Catholic dioceses (structured view) (including archdioceses)
 List of the Catholic dioceses of the United States

References

External links
 Roman Catholic Diocese of Chalan Kanoa Official Site

Chalan Kanoa
Chalan Kanoa
Chalan Kanoa
Catholic Church in the Northern Mariana Islands
Christian organizations established in 1984
Chalan Kanoa
1984 establishments in the Northern Mariana Islands